Gourav Baliyan is an Indian freestyle wrestler. He won the silver medal at the 2020 Asian Wrestling Championships in the 79 kg category.

References

Living people
Indian male sport wrestlers
Sport wrestlers from Uttar Pradesh
People from Muzaffarnagar district
Year of birth missing (living people)
Asian Wrestling Championships medalists
20th-century Indian people
21st-century Indian people